St. Vincent Pallotti College of Engineering and Technology (SVPCET) is an engineering college located at Gavsi Manapur, Wardha road, Nagpur, Maharashtra, India. It has been founded in 2004 by The Nagpur Pallottine Society. When the college started, it was affiliated to  Rashtrasant Tukadoji Maharaj Nagpur University (RTMNU). The University Grants Commission (UGC) conferred autonomous status on St. Vincent Pallotti College of Engineering & Technology on 7 September 2021. In 2019, it was given grade "A" by the National Assessment and Accreditation Council (NAAC).

References

External links
University Website

Rashtrasant Tukadoji Maharaj Nagpur University
Engineering colleges in Nagpur
Educational institutions established in 2004
2004 establishments in Maharashtra